Korthalsella (korthal mistletoe) is a genus of flowering plants in the sandalwood family, Santalaceae (sometimes/formerly considered to be in Viscaceae).  It contains about 25 species distributed in Asia, Africa, Australia, New Zealand, and some Pacific Islands.

Selected species

Korthalsella arthroclada Cranfield (Australia) 
Korthalsella breviarticulata (Tiegh.) Danser (Australia)
Korthalsella complanata (v. Tiegh.) Engl. - Kaumahana (Hawaii)
Korthalsella cylindrica (v. Tiegh.) Engl. - Hawaii korthal mistletoe (Hawaii)
Korthalsella degeneri Danser - Degener's korthal mistletoe (Island of Oahu in Hawaii)
Korthalsella disticha (Endl.) Engl. (Australia) 
Korthalsella emersa Barlow (Australia)
Korthalsella grayi Barlow (Australia)
Korthalsella japonica (Thunb.) Engl. (Australia)
Korthalsella latissima (v. Tiegh.) Danser - Kauai korthal mistletoe (Hawaii)
Korthalsella leucothrix Barlow (Australia)
Korthalsella papuana Danser (Australia, New Guinea)
Korthalsella platycaula (v. Tiegh.) Engl. - Poowaha (Hawaii)
Korthalsella remyana v. Tiegh. - Bog korthal mistletoe (Hawaii)
Korthalsella rubra (Tiegh.) Endl. (Australia)
Korthalsella salicornioides (A. Cunn.) Tiegh. (New Zealand)

Image Gallery

References

 
Santalaceae
Parasitic plants
Santalales genera